Tirumalasetti Laxminarayana Suman (born 15 December 1983) is an Indian first class cricketer. He made his debut in first class cricket for Hyderabad. He is a right-handed batsman who either opens the innings or bats in the middle order. In the second season of the Indian Premier League in 2009, Suman represented Deccan Chargers with success. In the 3rd season he helped the Chargers to the semi-finals. Mumbai Indians signed him for the 2011 season and Pune Warriors in the 2013 season. He is the first cousin of film producer Neelima Tirumalasetti.

External links
IPL page on Tirumalasetti Suman

References

Indian cricketers
Deccan Chargers cricketers
Hyderabad cricketers
Andhra cricketers
Sunrisers Hyderabad cricketers
Mumbai Indians cricketers
India Green cricketers
Pune Warriors India cricketers
Living people
1983 births
Cricketers from Hyderabad, India